Elections to the Bhopal Legislative Assembly were held on 27 March 1952. The Indian National Congress won a majority of seats and Shankar Dayal Sharma became the Chief Minister.

Constituencies
The Bhopal Legislative Assembly consisted of 30 seats distributed in seven two-member constituencies and sixteen single-member constituencies. Total 91 contestants were in fray for these 30 seats. Silwani legislative assembly had the maximum number of contestants (8 candidates), while Ichhawar had the minimum contestants (only 1 candidate, which was elected unopposed).

Political Parties
4 National parties along with Kisan Mazdoor Mandal took part in the assembly election. Indian National Congress emerged as the single largest party while no other party cross the double digit.

Results

|- style="background-color:#E9E9E9; text-align:center;"
!colspan=8|
|-
! class="unsortable" |
! Political Party !! Seats  Contested !! Won !! % of  Seats !! Votes !! Vote %
|- style="background: #90EE90;"
| 
! scope="row" style="text-align:left;" |Indian National Congress
| 28 || 25 || 83.33 || 1,17,656 || 52.01
|-
| 
! scope="row" style="text-align:left;" |Akhil Bharatiya Hindu Mahasabha
| 9 || 1 || 3.33 || 31,684 || 14.01
|-
| 
! scope="row" style="text-align:left;" | Independent politician
| 32 || 4 || 13.33 || 51,736 || 22.87
|- class="unsortable" style="background-color:#E9E9E9"
! colspan = 2| Total Seats
! 30 !! style="text-align:center;" |Voters !! 6,10,182 !! style="text-align:center;" |Turnout !! 2,26,210 (37.07%)
|}

Elected Members

State Reorganization and Merger
On 1 November 1956, Bhopal State was merged into Madhya Pradesh under States Reorganisation Act, 1956.

See also
1951–52 elections in India
Bhopal State
Bhopal State (1949–56)
1952 Madhya Bharat Legislative Assembly election
1952 Madhya Pradesh Legislative Assembly election
1952 Vindhya Pradesh Legislative Assembly election

References

Bhopal
State Assembly elections in Madhya Pradesh
Bhopal district
March 1952 events in Asia